Wu Shude (Chinese: 吴数德; born 18 September 1959) is a male Chinese weightlifter. He won a gold medal at 1984 Olympic Games in men's 56 kg.

References

Chinese male weightlifters
Olympic weightlifters of China
Weightlifters at the 1984 Summer Olympics
Olympic gold medalists for China
Living people
1959 births
Olympic medalists in weightlifting
Medalists at the 1984 Summer Olympics
Asian Games medalists in weightlifting
Weightlifters from Guangxi
People from Nanning
Weightlifters at the 1982 Asian Games
Asian Games gold medalists for China
Medalists at the 1982 Asian Games
20th-century Chinese people